Kevin Sykes (born 15 February 1946) is a former  Australian rules footballer who played with North Melbourne in the Victorian Football League (VFL).

Kevin won Benalla’s best and fairest in 1967.

Notes

External links 

Living people
1946 births
Australian rules footballers from Victoria (Australia)
North Melbourne Football Club players
Benalla Football Club players